Doom Patrol is an American superhero television series developed by Jeremy Carver. Based on the DC Comics superhero team of the same name, the series features Jane (Diane Guerrero), Rita Farr (April Bowlby), Vic Stone (Joivan Wade), Larry Trainor (Matt Bomer / Matthew Zuk), Cliff Steele (Brendan Fraser / Riley Shanahan),  and Chief (Timothy Dalton) as the members of the eponymous Doom Patrol. Although Bowlby, Bomer, and Fraser reprise their roles from the series Titans, the two shows are set in separate continuities.

The series premiered on February 15, 2019, exclusively for the DC Universe streaming service. The second season aired on both DC Universe and HBO Max, with the two streaming services releasing episodes simultaneously on June 25, 2020. A third season, released exclusively on HBO Max, premiered on September 23, 2021. In October 2021, the series was renewed for a fourth season which premiered on December 8, 2022. In January 2023, it was announced that the fourth season is going to be its final season.

Plot
Doom Patrol follows the unlikely heroes of the eponymous team who all received their powers through tragic circumstances and are generally shunned by society. Most members of the team were treated by the Chief, a medical doctor who gave them residence in his mansion to help protect them from the outside world. Their name derives from an earlier Doom Patrol team that was formed by the Chief.

The first members of the Doom Patrol to be introduced in the series are Jane, the dominant identity of a traumatized woman with dissociative identity disorder; Rita Farr, who struggles to prevent her body from turning to a gelatinous state; Larry Trainor, who has an entity of negative energy living inside of him; and Cliff Steele, whose brain was placed in a robot body following a car crash. The team is later joined by cybernetically enhanced superhero Vic Stone.

In the first season, the Chief is captured by the malevolent Mr. Nobody, sending the Doom Patrol on a journey to rescue him. Along the way, they discover secrets about themselves and the Chief, who they eventually learn is responsible for the tragic events that gave them their powers.

The second season sees the Doom Patrol joined by Dorothy Spinner, the Chief's daughter who possesses the ability to bring her imaginary friends to life. While the members of the Doom Patrol face their own personal dilemmas and contend with the truth about the Chief, Dorothy inadvertently endangers the world when her powers threaten to unleash an ancient entity known as the Candlemaker.

In the third season, Dorothy's battle with the Candlemaker reaches its climax and the Doom Patrol suffers a tragic loss when the Chief finally dies of old age. However, the Doom Patrol's ally Willoughby Kipling salvages Chief's head, stating that his time isn't over yet. In the aftermath, the team go their separate ways as they struggle with their identities when the arrival of Madame Rouge in a time machine sets them on a new path.

In the fourth and final season, the Doom Patrol begin doing more heroic activities while dealing with the coming of Immortus and the imminent Buttpocalypse.

Cast and characters

Main
 Diane Guerrero as Kay Challis / Crazy Jane: The dominant identity of Kay Challis, created to protect her. She and the other identities received their own unique powers from an experiment Kay was involuntarily subjected to.
 Inside Kay's subconsciousness, Guerrero portrays Driver 8 and Karen, while Anna Lore appears as Penny Farthing, Stephanie Czajkowski as Hammerhead, Tara Lee as Lucy Fugue, Chelsea Alana Rivera as Silver Tongue, Hannah Alline as Pretty Polly, Jackie Goldston as the Secretary, Monica Louwerens (voice and motion-capture) as the Weird Sisters, Helen Abell as Black Annis, Sarah Borne as Baby Doll, Ana Aguilar as Balladeer, Catherine Carlen as Doctor Harrison, Samantha Marie Ware as Miranda and her imposter, Shay Mack as Driller Bill, and Va Liu as Mama Pentecost. Leela Owen portrays the teenage version of the character while in her Miranda identity.
 April Bowlby as Rita Farr / Elasti-Woman: A former Hollywood actress, born Gertrude Cramp, whose cellular structure was altered into a gelatinous state after being exposed to an underwater toxic gas. Her powers allow her to change her body shape, but also cause her to struggle with maintaining a solid form. At the end of the third season, she becomes the new leader of the group. Lana Jean Turner portrays Rita as a child.
 Alan Tudyk as Eric Morden / Mr. Nobody (season 1): An omnipresent supervillain capable of traveling through dimensions and altering reality. Aware of being in a television series because of his abilities, he often breaks the fourth wall and manipulates events through his narration. Ed Asner portrays Mr. Nobody in his hospital patient disguise.
 Matt Bomer and Matthew Zuk as Larry Trainor / Negative Man: A former United States Air Force pilot with a negative energy entity living inside of him. Disfigured from the plane crash that ensued when he made contact with the negative spirit, he is covered in special bandages to prevent the spread of the radioactivity emitting from his body. Bomer voices the character and appears as Larry without the bandages in early flashbacks, while Matthew Zuk physically portrays him when wrapped in bandages and wearing prosthetic makeup when not in bandages. Braxton Alexander portrays Larry as a child.
 Brendan Fraser and Riley Shanahan as Cliff Steele / Robotman: A cyborg and former NASCAR driver whose brain was transplanted into a robotic body after a car crash destroyed his own body. Fraser voices the character and appears as the human version of Cliff in flashbacks and when he's in the Underground, while Riley Shanahan physically portrays him as a cyborg. Gibson Todd portrays Cliff as a child.
 Shanahan also voices the Brain, the leader of the Brotherhood of Evil in season 3.
 Timothy Dalton as Niles Caulder / The Chief (seasons 1–3): A medical doctor responsible for treating the members of the Doom Patrol and giving them residence in his mansion. In season 2 he gives up his immortality to help the team and let his daughter grow up. In the beginning of season 3 he dies of old age. Abi Monterey portrays the Chief as a child.
 Joivan Wade as Victor "Vic" Stone / Cyborg: A young, ambitious superhero who received cybernetic enhancements from his father Silas following an accident that led to his mother's death. While not a resident of Doom Manor, he joins the team because of his longtime friendship with the Chief. At the end of season 3 he removes his cybernetic enhancements and gains synthetic skin. Braelyn Rankins portrays Vic as a child.
 Skye Roberts as Kay Challis (season 3–present; recurring season 1–2): The original identity of a young girl who developed Jane and other distinct identities from childhood trauma. Due to her experiences, she remains a child in her subconsciousness while her identities assume control of her body.
 Michelle Gomez as Laura De Mille / Madame Rouge (season 3–present): A shapeshifter with ties to the Chief and the Brotherhood of Evil. At the end of season 3, she joins the Doom Patrol.

Recurring
 Julie McNiven as Sheryl Trainor (season 1–2), Larry's wife and the mother of his children
 Kyle Clements as John Bowers (season 1), Larry's secret lover who also served in the Air Force. Tom Fitzpatrick portrays the character as an old man in the present.
 Phil Morris as Silas Stone, Victor's father and a scientist who rebuilt him as a cyborg
 Bethany Anne Lind as Clara Steele, Cliff's daughter who survived a fatal accident in 1988, and was believed to be the only survivor of her family. Sydney Kowalske played a younger Clara Steele in flashbacks.
 Mark Sheppard as Willoughby Kipling, an occult detective, chaos magician, and member of the Knights Templar
 Curtis Armstrong as the voice of Ezekiel (season 1), a talking doomsday prophet cockroach
 Alec Mapa as Steve Larson / Animal-Vegetable-Mineral Man (season 1), a tourist who undergoes Von Fuchs' enhancement procedure and is turned into a mismatched fusion of animal, vegetable and mineral
 Charmin Lee as Elinor Stone (seasons 1, 3), Vic's mother and Silas' wife
 Alimi Ballard as Joshua Clay (season 1), the metahuman caretaker of the original Doom Patrol
 Tommy Snider as Ernest Franklin / Beard Hunter (season 1–2), a bounty hunter with the ability to track down individuals by consuming their facial hair. In season 4, he becomes the Butt Hunter where he hunted the Were-butts (season 4)
 Jon Briddell as Darren Jones (season 1, 3-4), an agent of the Bureau of Normalcy, an organization which once experimented on Larry after his accident who is later turned into a Were-butt
 Devan Chandler Long as Flex Mentallo (season 1–2), a superhero and cereal mascot who can alter reality through his muscle flexes
 Abi Monterey as Dorothy Spinner (season 2–present), the daughter of the Chief and a primitive woman who can bring her imaginary friends to life
 Karen Obilom as Roni Evers (season 2–present), a military veteran with a mysterious past and a genderbent version of Ron Evers who Vic meets while attending a PTSD support group
 Lex Lang as the voice of the Candlemaker (seasons 2–3), a dangerous entity who comes into contact with Dorothy and tempts her to make a wish
 Vanessa Carter and Kat Cressida as Darling-Come-Home (season 2), one of Dorothy's imaginary friends who has a mirror-like face with glowing eyes. Carter physically portrays Darling-Come-Home and Cressida voices the character.
 Brian T. Stevenson as the voice of Herschel (season 2), Dorothy's imaginary friend who takes the form of a giant spider
 Jonathan Lipow as the voice of Monsieur Mallah (season 3), an intelligent gorilla who replaced Eric Morden in the Brotherhood of Evil and acts as the Brain's second-in-command
 Sendhil Ramamurthy as Mister 104 (season 4), a man with molecular-restructuring abilities
 Madeline Zima as Casey Brinke / Space Case (season 4), a superheroine from Dorothy's favorite self-titled comic book series who materialized in the real world.

An uncredited actor voices Cyborg's computer system Grid.

Guest

Introduced in season 1
 Julian Richings as Heinrich Von Fuchs, the Nazi scientist whose experiments changed Morden into Mr. Nobody
 Katie Gunderson as Kate Steele, Cliff's wife who perished in a car accident
 Alan Heckner as Bump Weathers, one of Cliff's pit crew who has an affair with Kate, and later raises Clara after she is orphaned
 Gabrielle Byndloss as Patty, a woman who Cyborg saved from a mugging.
 Chantelle Barry as the voice of Baphomet, an oracle in the form of a female horse
 Lilli Birdsell as Mother Archon, Elliot's mother and the high priestess of the lost city of Nurnheim
 Ted Sutherland as Elliot Patterson, an 18-year-old boy who is the key to the Cult of the Unwritten Book's attempt to summon the Decreator, an interdimensional entity who will unmake the world
 Ethan McDowell as Charles Forsythe, a member of the Bureau of Normalcy that once experimented on Larry. Ted Ferguson portrays an older Forsythe.
 Matthew Sean Blumm and Michael Harney as R.J. Steele, the father of Cliff and the grandfather of Clara. Blumm portrayed him in season one while Harney portrayed him in season two and three.
 Will Kemp and Dave Bielawski as Steve Dayton / Mento, leader of the original Doom Patrol. Kemp portrays the younger Mento and Bielawski portrays the older Mento.
 Jasmine Kaur and Madhur Jaffrey as Arani Desai / Celsius, a member of the original Doom Patrol with power over fire and ice. Kaur portrays the younger Celsius while Jaffrey portrays the older Celsius.
 Dennis Cockrum as Sydney Bloom, a film producer of Bloom Studios who Rita tries to get cast in one of his upcoming movies
 Lesa Wilson as Rhea Jones / Lodestone, a member of the original Doom Patrol with magnetic abilities. Lesa Wilson portrays the younger Lodestone while an uncredited actress portrays the older Lodestone.
 Alan Mingo Jr. as Morris Wilson / Maura Lee Karupt, a former agent of the Bureau of Normalcy-turned-crossdressing cabaret singer on Danny the Street.  Morris Wilson's drag queen-pseudonym, "Maura Lee Karupt", is a pun on the phrase, "Morally Corrupt".  
 Pisay Pao as Slava, an immortal fur-covered cavewoman with whom Niles fell in love and the mother of Dorothy
 David A. MacDonald as Daddy, Jane's sexually abusive father. MacDonald also voices and motion-captures the version of him in the Underground's Well area whose body is composed of puzzle pieces.
 Joan Van Ark as the voice of Mrs. Franklin, the mother of Beard Hunter who is often heard off-screen.
 Haley Strode and Susan Williams as Dolores Mentallo, Flex's wife. Strode portrays the younger Dolores while Williams portrays the older Dolores.
 Victoria Blade as Millie, Eric Morden's ex-girlfriend

Introduced in season 2
 Mark Ashworth as the ringmaster, the owner of a freak show that captured Dorothy
 John Getz as Paul Trainor, Larry's son. Fletcher Hammand portrays a younger Paul.
 Brandon Perea and Dan Martin as Doctor Tyme, a former scientist who gained the ability to manipulate time through contact with an alien element called Continuinium. Perea physically portrays Doctor Tyme and Martin voices the character.
 Roger Floyd as Red Jack, an inter-dimensional being who derives his power from the pain of others
 Michael Tourek as Kiss, the second-in-command of the SeX-Men
 Michael Shenefelt as Cuddles, a member of the SeX-Men responsible for surveillance
 Tracey Bonner as Torture, the leader of the SeX-Men
 Brad Brinkley as Shadowy Mr. Evans, a sex demon
 Irene Ziegler as Micki Harris, a community theater director and playwright
 Mariana Klaveno as Valentina Vostok, a member of the Chief's space research team who made contact with a negative energy entity
 Charity Cervantes as Isabel Feathers, a community theater actress who is cast as a character based on Rita in Micki's play 
 Derek Evans as Zip Callahan, the pilot for the Chief's space research team
 Jason Burkey as Specs, one of the members in the Chief's space research team
 Jhemma Ziegler as the Scant Queen.
 Phil Morris as Doctor Cowboy, the imaginary friend of Vic.
 Joshua Mikel as Imaginary Jesus, the imaginary friend of Cliff.
 Donna Jay Fulks as the voice of Roxy, Rita's imaginary friend, a woman made of disparate facial and body features cut out of magazines

Introduced in season 3
 Walnette Marie Santiago as Mel, the wife of Clara
 Stephen Murphy as Garguax the Decimator, an alien warrior employed by the Brotherhood of Evil to assassinate Rita Farr.
 Billy Boyd as Samuelson, Garguax's loyal and overzealous servant.
 Sebastian Croft as Charles Rowland, a member of the Dead Boy Detectives who died from hypothermia in a lake after being bullied. 
 Ty Tennant as Edwin Paine, a member of the Dead Boy Detectives who died in 1916 after a horrific experience. 
 Madalyn Horcher as Crystal Palace, a teenage girl who was once possessed by a demon, and saved by the Dead Boy Detectives. She serves as the Detectives' medium.
 Rose Bianco as Grandma Jane, the grandmother of Kay.
 Ruth Connell as Night Nurse, a demonic being that works for Death.
 Erik Passoja as the voice of Shipley, the A.I. of the time machine that Madame Rouge operated.
 Micah Joe Parker as Malcolm, a former member of the Sisterhood of Dada with a bird cage in his chest and the power of invisibility. Based on the character of Agent !.
 Wynn Everett as Shelley Byron / The Fog, leader of the Sisterhood of Dada with the ability to alter reality in thick fog.
 Miles Mussenden as Lloyd, an artist and member of the Sisterhood of Dada with parts of a bicycle attached to his back. Based on the character of Frenzy.
 Anita Kalathara as Holly, a narcoleptic member of the Sisterhood of Dada who plays Barry Manilow through headphones to keep awake. Based on the character of Sleepwalk.
 Gina Hiraizumi as Sachiko, a germophobic member of the Sisterhood of Dada kept in a glass case. Based on the character of The Quiz.
 Richard Gant as General Tony, the action figure that Vic once owned.
 Brendan Pedder as the voice of Puppet Harry, the puppet version of Kay's stuffed sheep.

Introduced in season 4
 Joseph Avail as Codpiece, a supervillain that wears a Codpiece-themed weapon system.
 Joseph Echavarria, a minion of Codpiece who has a butt cannon.
 Keiko Agena as Dr. Margaret Wu, a scientist at the Bureau of Normalcy who found a way to control the were-butts.
 James Smagula as the voice of Nicholas, a were-butt that was taken in by Dr. Margaret Wu.
 Timeca Seretti as Doctor Janus, a psychic vampire previously encountered by Chief who is part of a plan to enact the return of Immortus.
 Elijah Rashad Reed as Deric Hayes, an old friend of Cyborg.
 Tyler Mane as Torminox, the father/archenemy of Space Case who was brought to life to assist in the return of Immortus.

Notes

Episodes

Season 1 (2019)

Season 2 (2020)

Season 3 (2021)

Season 4 (2022–23)

The final six episodes were written by Tamara Becher-Wilkinson & Bob Barth, Eric Dietel, Aliza Berger & Talia Berger, Akaylah Ellison & Tom Farrell, Chris Dingess, and Shoshana Sachi & Ezra Claytan Daniels respectively.

Production

Development
Doom Patrol was announced on May 14, 2018, as an intended spin-off of Titans for video on demand service DC Universe after co-creator and executive producer Geoff Johns revealed that Titans' fourth episode would feature and be titled after the Doom Patrol on February 10, 2018. Despite the initial order and sharing characters and actors, however, Doom Patrol occupies a separate continuity from Titans.

Fifteen episodes were developed for the first season, which premiered on February 15, 2019, and concluded on May 24, 2019. Jeremy Carver wrote the pilot, and served as an executive producer alongside Johns, Greg Berlanti, and Sarah Schechter. Production companies involved with the series include Berlanti Productions and Warner Bros. Television. The series is influenced by writer Grant Morrison's run of the comic.

On July 20, 2019, it was announced at San Diego Comic-Con that Doom Patrol had been renewed for a second season, which premiered on both DC Universe and WarnerMedia's video on demand service HBO Max on June 25, 2020. The season was originally intended to have 10 episodes, but due to the COVID-19 pandemic, production was shut down before the 10th episode could be completed and the season instead comprised nine episodes. In September 2020, the series was renewed for a third season exclusively on HBO Max. In October 2021, HBO Max renewed the series for a fourth season. In January 2023, it was reported that the series is to end with the fourth season.

Casting
In July 2018, it was announced that April Bowlby, Brendan Fraser, and Matt Bomer would star in Doom Patrol as Rita Farr, the voice of Cliff Steele, and the voice of Larry Trainor, respectively, after being cast as the characters for guest appearances in Titans. Diane Guerrero was also announced to be joining Bowlby, Fraser, and Bomer as Jane. In August 2018, Joivan Wade was cast as Victor "Vic" Stone / Cyborg, Alan Tudyk was cast as Eric Morden / Mr. Nobody, and Riley Shanahan was cast to physically portray the cyborg version of Cliff. The next month, Timothy Dalton was cast as Niles Caulder / Chief and Matthew Zuk was cast in October 2018 to physically portray the bandage-covered Larry. In March 2019, Mark Sheppard was announced as Willoughby Kipling.

In January 2020, Roger Floyd was cast as Red Jack, a malevolent entity, in the series' second season. Other second-season castings that February included Abigail Shapiro as the Chief's superpowered daughter, Dorothy Spinner, and Karen Obilom as Roni Evers, a military veteran with a mysterious past who Vic meets while attending a PTSD support group. Samantha Marie Ware was cast as one of Jane's identities in March 2020, later revealed to be the former primary identity Miranda. On March 10, 2021, Michelle Gomez was cast as Madame Rouge, a new series regular for the third season. In April 2021, Sebastian Croft and Ty Tennant were cast as the Dead Boy Detectives. Later that month Micah Joe Parker, Wynn Everett, Miles Mussenden, Anita Kalathara and Gina Hiraizumi were cast as members of the Sisterhood of Dada, while Madalyn Horcher was cast as a guest in connection with Sebastian Croft and Ty Tennant. On September 23, 2022, Madeline Zima was cast as Casey Brinke for the fourth season. On October 17, 2022, Sendhil Ramamurthy joined the cast as Mr. 104 in a recurring capacity for the fourth season.

Filming
Principal photography for the first season began on August 30, 2018, in Olde Town Conyers, Georgia. Filming continued in Georgia throughout September 2018, in Lawrenceville and at Briarcliff Mansion. Principal photography for the first season finished on April 10, 2019.

Filming for the second season began November 2019 in Georgia.

Filming for the third season began on January 4, 2021. Filming wrapped on June 6, 2021.

Filming for the fourth season began in February 2022 and was completed on August 16, 2022.

Release
The first season of Doom Patrol premiered on DC Universe on February 15, 2019, with episodes releasing until May 24, 2019. The first season consists of 15 episodes. A second season premiered on both DC Universe and HBO Max on June 25, 2020. The third season premiered on September 23, 2021, exclusively on HBO Max. The fourth season premiered on December 8, 2022, with the first two episodes of the season available immediately and the rest debuting on a weekly basis on HBO Max.

In the United Kingdom, the first season was released exclusively on StarzPlay on January 2, 2020. The second season premiered July 16, 2021. The third season premiered November 14, 2021. 

In Australia, the series is streamed on the Australian streaming service Binge.

Reception

Critical response
On review aggregator Rotten Tomatoes, the first season holds a 96% approval rating based on 53 reviews, with an average rating of 8/10. The website's critical consensus reads, "DC Universe finds breakout material in this iteration of Doom Patrol thanks to a fully committed cast and the writing's faith in weirdness." Metacritic, which uses a weighted average, assigned the series a score of 70 out of 100 based on reviews from 18 critics, indicating "generally favorable reviews".

Jesse Schedeen of IGN rated the series premiere 9.0 out of 10, stating that "Doom Patrol is the best reason yet to sign up for DC's streaming service. [Doom Patrol] offers a wicked sense of humor with heart, wit and tragedy to spare. The cast works incredibly well to form an entertaining dysfunctional family."

The second season holds a 97% approval rating on Rotten Tomatoes, based on 29 reviews with an average rating of 8.3/10. Its critical consensus reads, "As entertaining as the first, but with more emotional depth, Doom Patrols second season explores darker corners without sacrificing any of its wonderful weirdness."

The third season has a 100% approval rating on Rotten Tomatoes, based on 10 reviews with an average rating of 7.9/10. Its critics consensus states, "By adding strange new spices and a heaping tablespoon of unconventional plotting, Doom Patrol remains an endearing bazaar of absurd delights."

The fourth season has received a 100% approval rating on Rotten Tomatoes, based on 8 reviews with an average rating of 7.7/10.

Accolades

Further media

Titans

Rita Farr, Larry Trainor, and Cliff Steele from the Doom Patrol continuity were intended to appear in the original season 1 finale of Titans. The appearances were removed after the original season finale was pulled.

Arrowverse

The Doom Patrol incarnations of Jane, Rita Farr, Vic Stone, Larry Trainor, and Cliff Steele make cameo appearances in the Arrowverse crossover event "Crisis on Infinite Earths", which depicts the series as taking place on the world of Earth-21. Diane Guerrero, April Bowlby, Joivan Wade, Matthew Zuk, and Riley Shanahan appear in their respective roles from Doom Patrol through archival footage.

References

External links
 
 

 
2010s American LGBT-related drama television series
2010s American science fiction television series
2019 American television series debuts
2020s American LGBT-related drama television series
2020s American science fiction television series
American action adventure television series
2010s American comedy-drama television series
2020s American comedy-drama television series
2010s American superhero comedy television series
2020s American superhero comedy television series
DC Universe (streaming service) original programming
Doom Patrol
English-language television shows
HBO Max original programming
LGBT-related superhero television shows
Television productions suspended due to the COVID-19 pandemic
Television shows based on DC Comics
Television series by Warner Bros. Television Studios